Hristo Stefanov Mladenov (7 January 1928 –  24 August 1996) was a Bulgarian football player and manager. He was the manager of the Bulgaria national team during the 1974 FIFA World Cup.

He coached Bulgaria three times, and narrowly failed to get them to the finals of Euro 88. He also managed Spartak Pleven, Spartak Sofia, Levski Sofia, Beroe Stara Zagora, Slavia Sofia, Farense and Belenenses.

References

1928 births
Bulgarian footballers
Bulgarian football managers
1974 FIFA World Cup managers
Bulgaria national football team managers
C.F. Os Belenenses managers
Bulgarian expatriates in Portugal
PFC Levski Sofia managers
PFC Beroe Stara Zagora managers
PFC Slavia Sofia managers
1996 deaths
Expatriate football managers in Portugal
Association footballers not categorized by position